Gnatheulia is a genus of moths belonging to the family Tortricidae.

Species
Gnatheulia gnathocera Razowski, 1997

See also
List of Tortricidae genera

References

 , 1997, Acta zoologica cracoviensia 40: 82.
 , 2005, World Catalogue of Insects 5

External links
tortricidae.com

Euliini
Tortricidae genera